Northern Mariana Islands competed at the 2011 Pacific Games in Nouméa, New Caledonia between August 27 and September 10, 2011. As of June 28, 2011 Northern Mariana Islands has listed 48 competitors.

Athletics

Northern Mariana Islands has qualified 3 athletes.

Men
Douglas Ogumo Dillay
Trevor John Ogumoro

Women
Rachel Lesh Abrams

Baseball

Northern Mariana Islands has qualified a team.  Each team can have a maximum of 20 athletes.

Men -  Team Tournament
Jerome Delos Santos Jr
Miguel Iguel
Jesus Taisakan Iguel
Joshua Jones
Byron Scott Kaipat
Keoni Agulto Lizama
Juan Ulloa Maratita
Tyron Taro Omar
Manuel Cepeda Sablan Jr
Eric Tenorio
Franco Flores
Elton Aldan Santos
Vincente Pastorites Cepeda Jr
Craig Salas Sanchez

Golf

Northern Mariana Islands has qualified 4 athletes.

Men
Adam Hardwicke
Antonio Nepaial Satur
Jeffrey George Taylor
Jesus Igisomar Wabol Jr

Volleyball

Beach Volleyball

Northern Mariana Islands has qualified a men's team.  Each team can consist of a maximum of 2 members.

Men
Tyce Jon Mister
Christopher Jon Nelson

References

2011 in Northern Mariana Islands sports
Nations at the 2011 Pacific Games
Northern Mariana Islands at the Pacific Games